Lal Spencer Roach, III (born September 2, 1977) is a Republican member of the Florida Legislature representing the state's 79th House district, which includes part of Lee County.

History
A native of Louisiana, Roach is a veteran of the United States Coast Guard, where he served as a judge advocate general while on deployment in the Middle East. For his military service, he was awarded the Meritorious Service Medal, Coast Guard Commendation Medal, Coast Guard Achievement Medal, and the Navy and Marine Corps Achievement Medal.

He moved to Florida in 2000.

Education
He graduated from Edison Community College with an Associate of Arts in 2003, from Florida Gulf Coast University with a Bachelor of Arts in 2005, and from University of Miami School of Law with a Juris Doctor in 2012.

Florida House of Representatives
Roach defeated Matthew Shawn Miller in the August 28, 2018 Republican primary, winning 58.7% of the vote. In the November 6, 2018 general election, Roach won 58.92% of the vote, defeating Democrat Mark Lipton.

References

Republican Party members of the Florida House of Representatives
Living people
21st-century American politicians
Florida Gulf Coast University alumni
University of Miami School of Law alumni
1977 births